Chester Harding may refer to:

Chester Harding (painter) (1792–1866), American artist
Chester Harding (governor) (1866–1936), Governor of Panama Canal Zone
Chester Harding House, historic house in Massachusetts, U.S.A.